1-Keto-1,2,3,4-tetrahydrophenanthrene (THP-1), or 1,2,3,4-tetrahydrophenanthren-1-one, is a synthetic steroid-like compound which was reported to be the first synthetic estrogen, or the first synthetic compound identified with estrogenic activity. It was first synthesized in 1933 by Cook et al. and was tested due to its similarity to the presumed chemical structure of estrone. Upon reassessment many decades later, the compound was found to bind only weakly to the estrogen receptors, and, unexpectedly, did not actually have functional activity as an estrogen or antiestrogen in vitro or in vivo. It did, however, show some androgenic and antiandrogenic activity in vitro.

See also
 Estrin

References

Ketones
Phenanthrenes
Synthetic estrogens
Substances discovered in the 1930s